Statistics of Second Division Football Tournament in the 2020 season. 

2018 Third Division Football Tournament champions Rock Street Sports Club decided not to play in second division despite promotion, relegating them to Maldivian Third Division Football Tournament.

On 13 October 2019, President of Football Association of Maldives, Bassam Adeel Jaleel announced that Maldives Under 19 will compete in the Second Division Football Tournament from 2020 season onward.

The winners of the semi-finals; Club Valencia and Super United Sports advance to the final, with gaining automatic promotion to the Dhivehi Premier League for the following season, as New Radiant Sports Club and Victory Sports Club both teams being suspended. Both New Radiant and Victory will have to play in the Second Division Football Tournament even if their suspension cast aside.

Teams
A total of nine teams compete in the league.

Personnel and sponsoring

Group stage
From each group, the top two teams will be advanced for the Semi-finals.

All times listed are Maldives Standard Time. UTC+05:00

Group 1

Group 2

Semi-finals

Final

Awards

Final ranking

Per statistical convention in football, matches decided in extra time are counted as wins and losses, while matches decided by penalty shoot-out are counted as draws.

References

Maldivian Second Division Football Tournament seasons
Maldives